Ice stock sport, also known as Bavarian Curling, was featured in the Winter Olympic Games demonstration programme in 1936 and 1964.

See also
 Ice stock sport
 1936 Winter Olympics
 1964 Winter Olympics
 Curling at the Winter Olympics, a similar sport

References

Olympics
Discontinued sports at the Winter Olympics
1936 Winter Olympics events
1964 Winter Olympics events